Pierre-Ambroise Bosse (born 11 May 1992) is a French track and field athlete specializing in middle-distance running, and in particular the 800 metres event.

Career
Bosse won the bronze medal in the 800 metres at the 2012 European Championships held in Helsinki.

On 18 July 2014, Bosse ran his personal best time (1:42.53) at the 800 metres race at the Herculis meet, a Diamond League meeting held in Monaco; he finished the race in second place behind  Nijel Amos of Botswana. Both Amos's and Bosse's times at this meeting were the first and second fastest 800 metre times in the world for 2014; with Bosse running fast enough to be the new French national record holder for the 800 metres outdoors.

On 8 August 2017, he won the men's 800 m at the IAAF World Championships in London in a time of 1:44.67. With the absence of David Rudisha due to injury the 800 m final was relatively wide open. However, with Bosse not having run close to the world lead, and having to start his season late due to injury he was not considered a favorite. The final went out at a moderate pace with the leader Brandon McBride passing through 400 m in 50.76. While Kipyegon Bett and Nijel Amos battled each other as they took the lead, Bosse ran a clear path around the outside to take the lead going into the final turn. He emerged from the turn with a three-metre lead on the battle and neither could muster a challenge. His final challengers were Adam Kszczot and Kyle Langford, making a late run from the back of the pack, but Bosse was too far ahead to see the challengers. He looked at the scoreboard, pointing at himself in disbelief.

International competitions

References

External links

1992 births
Living people
French male middle-distance runners
Olympic athletes of France
Athletes (track and field) at the 2012 Summer Olympics
Athletes (track and field) at the 2016 Summer Olympics
World Athletics Championships athletes for France
European Championships (multi-sport event) bronze medalists
European Athletics Championships medalists
World Athletics Championships medalists
Sportspeople from Nantes
World Athletics Championships winners
French Athletics Championships winners
Athletes (track and field) at the 2020 Summer Olympics
20th-century French people
21st-century French people